Louis Carl Heinrich Friedrich Paschen (22 January 1865 - 25 February 1947), was a German  physicist, known for his work on electrical discharges. He is also known for the Paschen series, a series of hydrogen spectral lines in the infrared region that he  first observed in 1908. He established the now widely used Paschen curve in his article "Über die zum Funkenübergang in Luft, Wasserstoff und Kohlensäure bei verschiedenen Drücken erforderliche Potentialdifferenz". He is known for the Paschen-Back effect, which is the Zeeman effect's becoming non-linear at high magnetic field.  He helped explain the hollow cathode effect in 1916.

Life
Paschen was born in Schwerin, Mecklenburg-Schwerin. From 1884 to 1888 he studied at the universities of Berlin and Strassburg, after which he became an assistant at the Academy of Münster. He became a professor at the Technical Academy of Hannover in 1893 and professor of physics at the University of Tübingen in 1901. He served as president of the Physikalisch-Technischen Reichsanstalt from 1924–33 and an honorary professor of the University of Berlin in 1925.

During the second world war he had the Chinese scientist He Zehui to stay at his house and she became like a daughter to him. With his help she was introduced to Walther Bothe who led the Kaiser Wilhelm Institute in Heidelberg.

Paschen taught in Berlin until his death in Potsdam in 1947.

See also
 Paschen notation
 Townsend discharge

External links

References

1865 births
1947 deaths
19th-century German physicists
People from Schwerin
People from the Grand Duchy of Mecklenburg-Schwerin
Humboldt University of Berlin alumni
Academic staff of the Humboldt University of Berlin
University of Strasbourg alumni
Academic staff of the University of Münster
Academic staff of the University of Hanover
Academic staff of the University of Tübingen
Honorary Members of the USSR Academy of Sciences
20th-century German physicists